Young and Dangerous is a 1996 Hong Kong crime film about a group of triad members, detailing their adventures and dangers in a Hong Kong Triad society. Directed by the film's cinematographer Andrew Lau, the film features a large ensemble cast, which includes Ekin Cheng, Jordan Chan, Gigi Lai, Jason Chu, Jerry Lamb, Michael Tse, Francis Ng and Simon Yam.

Based on a popular comic book series named "Guwak tsai" or "Teddy Boy" in English.  This film contributed a lot to the public image of triads and was condemned by certain quarters as glorifying secret triad societies. However, it was immensely popular in Hong Kong and spun a long list of sequels and spin-offs. Its main actors and actresses have also become major stars in their own right.

Plot
Beginning in 1985, teenagers Chan Ho Nam (Ekin Cheng), his best friends "Chicken" Chiu (Jordan Chan), Dai Tin-Yee (Michael Tse), Pou Pan (Jerry Lam) and older brother Chow Pan (Jason Chu) idolise the local "Hung Hing" Society and one of its leaders, "Uncle Bee" (Ng Chi Hung). When Ho Nam and his friends are beaten by Hung Hing's "Ugly Kwan" (Francis Ng) and his men following a misunderstanding, they decide to join the society, following Bee.

Ten years later, in 1995, Ho Nam and his buddies have established themselves as Bee's enforcers, performing their first successful hit on Kwan's associate "Ba Bai" (Joe Chen). At the same time, Brother Fai Hung has the stuttering Smartie (Gigi Lai) carjack Ho Nam's Toyota MR2 and demand payment, but unfortunately she gets caught by Ho Nam and his friends and is punished by eating dozens of Chinese barbecue pork buns.

Seeing Ho Nam is making a name for himself in the society, Kwan attempts to buy him out and have Ho Nam work for him instead of Bee, but the gangster refuses. When he finds Smartie about to be forced into an adult film produced by Kwan's studio, Ho Nam takes her aside, claiming she is his woman. The indebted Smartie follows him, even beginning to fall for him. One day, Bee is tasked with an assignment by Hung Hing chairman Chiang Tin Sung (Simon Yam) to head to Macau and perform another hit. Bee orders Ho Nam and his men to execute the plan. Sadly, this was all a ploy on Kwan's doing: by using Chicken's fidelity to separate  him from Ho Nam and falsifying information to chairman Chiang, Ho Nam and his remaining friends are ambushed by other triad members under Kwan. Chow Pan is brutally killed and Ho Nam is blamed for the failed hit. Friendships begin to tear apart when Chicken's girlfriend and Ho Nam are kidnapped and drugged by Kwan's men into sex, videotaping their actions as proof of violating orders. With nearly all of Hung Hing looking for them for explanations, Chicken heads to Taiwan in exile.

At a Hung Hing summit, Kwan accuses Bee of failing the hit and Ho Nam for breaking the "code" of sleeping with his best friend's woman, with the videotape as evidence. Kwan also takes the opportunity of blaming chairman Chiang for not inducing better protocols within the society and nominates himself as the new chairman. Other branch leaders are in agreement, thus Chiang steps down and Kwan takes the head position, with only Bee opposing him. To settle things, Ho Nam is punished and banned from rejoining Hung Hing. Ten months later, Kwan orders Bee killed alongside his entire family. With most of Hung Hing siding with Kwan, and no evidence to support Kwan killing Bee, Ho Nam can do next to nothing, until Chicken returns from Taiwan, now a branch leader in a local triad and re-establishes relations with his friends. Deciding to get rid of Kwan and bring back the morally inclined Chiang, Ho Nam and Chicken bribe other branch leaders into assassinating Kwan. Working indirectly with local law enforcement, who have discovered Kwan has been smuggling cocaine using his film studio, Ho Nam and his allies manage to corner Kwan, who admits to everything, until he tries to escape using Pou Pan as a hostage. He is eventually shot and killed by a police officer for wielding a firearm and pointing at him.

Chiang returns and retakes the position of Hung Hing chairman, congratulating Ho Nam for his efforts, ensuring his name will be well known throughout the society. This movie glorifies the value in being virtuous even in a life of crime. In a world in which loyalties do not exist, these group of young gangsters stood by their friends and followed the code of friendship even to the end.

Cast and roles
 Ekin Cheng - Chan Ho Nam
 Jordan Chan - Chicken 
 Gigi Lai - Smartie
 Jason Chu - Chow Pan
 Jerry Lamb - Pou Pan
 Michael Tse - Dai Tin-Yee
 Francis Ng - Ugly Kwan
 Simon Yam - Chiang Tin-Sung
 Suki Chan - Ho Yan
 Ng Chi Hung - Uncle Bee
 Joe Chen - Ba-Bai
 Ha Ping - Mrs. Lee
 Dion Lam - Silly Keung
 Spencer Lam - Father Lam
 Lee Siu-kei - Kei
 Shing Fui-On - Brother Sau
 Wang Lung-wei - Master Wai
 Wai-Man Chan - Camel Head

See also 
 Young and Dangerous (series)

References

External links 
 

 
Triad films
1996 action thriller films
1996 crime thriller films
Hong Kong crime films
Hong Kong action thriller films
1990s Cantonese-language films
Films set in Hong Kong
Films set in Macau
Films set in 1985
Films set in 1995
1996 films
Golden Harvest films
Films directed by Andrew Lau
1990s Hong Kong films